Christine Mary Rutherford Fowler,  (born 1950) is a British geologist and academic. From 2012 to 2020, she served as the Master of Darwin College, Cambridge. She was previously a lecturer at Royal Holloway, University of London, rising to become Dean of its Faculty of Science.

Early life and education
Fowler was born in 1950 to Rosemary and Peter Fowler. She comes from a family of eminent scientists. A great-grandfather was Ernest Rutherford, the 'father of nuclear physics', and her grandfather, Rutherford's son-in-law, was the mathematical physicist Ralph H. Fowler.

She studied mathematics at Girton College, Cambridge, graduating with a first class Bachelor of Arts (BA) degree in 1972. In 1972 she joined Darwin College, Cambridge to undertake post-graduate studies in geophysics and completed her Doctor of Philosophy (PhD) degree in 1976. Her doctoral thesis was titled "Seismic Studies of the Mid-Atlantic Ridge".

Academic career
From 1977 to 1978, Fowler was a Royal Society European Fellow at ETH Zürich in Switzerland. She joined the University of Saskatchewan in Canada as a research associate in 1981. She was an assistant professor from 1982 to 1983, before returning to her research associate position. She remained associated with the university as an adjunct professor between 1991 and 2001.

In 1992, Fowler joined Royal Holloway, University of London as a lecturer; she was later promoted to senior lecturer. Between 2002 and 2008, she was head of the Department of Earth Sciences. She was made Professor of Geophysics in 2003. In 2011, she was appointed Dean of the Faculty of Science. 

In April 2012, it was announce that Fowler had been elected the sixth Master of Darwin College, Cambridge. She took up the appointment in October 2012, succeeding William Brown.  She retired in 2020 and was succeeded by Dr Michael Rands.

Personal life
In 1975, Fowler married Euan Nisbet, now a Professor of Earth Sciences at Royal Holloway. They met at Darwin college, Cambridge while students. Together, they have three children: two daughters and a son. Their daughter (Ruth) Ellen Nisbet, who is a biochemist and academic, also studied at Darwin College, Cambridge.

Honours
In 1996, Fowler was awarded the Prestwich Medal by the Geological Society of London. She is a Fellow of the Royal Astronomical Society (FRAS), a Fellow of the Geological Society of London (FGS), and a Fellow of the Royal Canadian Geographical Society (FRCGS). In July 2018, Fowler was awarded an honorary Doctor of Science (DSc) by the University of Leeds, and by the University of Edinburgh.

Selected works

References

Living people
British geologists
Academics of Royal Holloway, University of London
Masters of Darwin College, Cambridge
Alumni of Girton College, Cambridge
Alumni of Darwin College, Cambridge
1950 births
Academic staff of ETH Zurich
Academic staff of the University of Saskatchewan
Fellows of the Royal Astronomical Society
Fellows of the Geological Society of London
Royal Canadian Geographical Society fellows
Geophysicists